Brachysiraceae is a family of diatoms.

Genera
Brachysira
Nupela
†Tertiarius

References

 
Diatom families